USS LST-462 was a United States Navy  used in the Asiatic-Pacific Theater during World War II. As with many of her class, the ship was never named. Instead, she was referred to by her hull designation.

Construction
The ship was laid down on 4 October 1942, under Maritime Commission (MARCOM) contract, MC hull 982, by Kaiser Shipyards, Vancouver, Washington; launched 6 November 1942; sponsored by Mrs. Eugene E. Blazier; and commissioned on 21 February 1943.

Service history
During World War II, LST-462 was assigned to the Asiatic-Pacific theater. She took part in the Hollandia operation in May 1944; the Western New Guinea operations, the Biak Islands operation in May and June 1944, the Noemfoor Island operation in July 1944, the Cape Sansapor operation in July and August 1944, and the Morotai landing in September 1944; the Leyte operation in October 1944; the Lingayen Gulf landings in January 1945; and the Balikpapan operation in June and July 1945.

Following the war, LST-462 returned to the United States and was decommissioned on 21 March 1946, and struck from the Navy list on 1 May, that same year. On 15 December 1948, the tank landing ship was sold to Hughes Bros., Inc., of New York City, and subsequently scrapped.

Honors and awards
LST-462 earned five battle stars for her World War II service.

Notes 

Citations

Bibliography 

Online resources

External links

 

1942 ships
World War II amphibious warfare vessels of the United States
LST-1-class tank landing ships of the United States Navy
S3-M2-K2 ships
Ships built in Vancouver, Washington